McDD may refer to:

Multiple complex developmental disorder
McDonnell Douglas